Marysville may refer to several places:

Australia 
 Marysville, Victoria

Canada 
 Marysville, British Columbia, now part of Kimberley
 Marysville, New Brunswick
 Marysville, Frontenac County, Ontario, on Wolfe Island
 Marysville, Hastings County, Ontario, in Tyendinaga

United States 
 Marysville, California
Marysville Cemetery
 Marysville, Florida
 Marysville, Indiana, in Clark County
 Marysville, Pike County, Indiana
 Marysville, Iowa
 Marysville, Kansas
 Marysville, Michigan
 Marysville, Montana
 Marysville, Ohio
 Corvallis, Oregon, originally known as Marysville
 Marysville, Pennsylvania
 Marysville, Texas
 Marysville, Washington

See also 
 Marysville station (disambiguation)
 Maryville (disambiguation)
 Maysville (disambiguation)
 Marystown (disambiguation)